Warren Township is a township in Story County, Iowa, USA.  As of the 2000 census, its population was 562.

Geography
According to the USGS, it contains two cemeteries: the Bergen Cemetery and the McCallsburg Cemetery.

County Road S27 runs north and south through the township and County Road E18 runs east–west.

The East Indian Creek flows through the township.

Warren Township is adjacent to Howard, Lincoln and Richland townships.
 USGS Geographic Names Information System (GNIS)

External links
 US-Counties.com
 City-Data.com

Townships in Story County, Iowa
Townships in Iowa